, New Jersey has six teams from major professional sports leagues playing in the state, with only one team identifying themselves as solely being from the state. The other remaining teams identify themselves as being from the New York metropolitan area with the National Women's Soccer League team having a team name that includes both New Jersey and New York. The National Hockey League and National Basketball Association teams representing Philadelphia have their training facilities in South Jersey.

Major League professional sports

The National Hockey League's New Jersey Devils, based in Newark at the Prudential Center, is the only major league franchise to solely bear the state's name. Founded in 1974 in Kansas City, Missouri as the Kansas City Scouts, the team played in Denver, Colorado as the Colorado Rockies from 1976 until the spring of 1982 when naval architect, businessman, and Jersey City native John J. McMullen purchased and relocated the franchise to Brendan Byrne Arena in East Rutherford's Meadowlands Sports Complex under its current identity. While the organization was largely a failure on the ice in Kansas City, Denver, and its first years in New Jersey, the Devils would ultimately begin their rise to prominence in the late 1980s and early 1990s under the tenure of Hall of Fame president and general manager Lou Lamoriello, winning the Stanley Cup in 1995, 2000, and 2003, and act as an annual fixture in the Stanley Cup playoffs for the majority of two decades. The organization is the youngest out of all nine "Big Four" major league teams within the New York Metropolitan Area and media market dominated in terms of ice hockey by the New York Rangers and Islanders prior to the Devils' arrival, but has ultimately been successful in establishing a visible and dedicated following throughout the northern and central portions of the state. In 2018, one of the Devils' fiercest rivals, the Philadelphia Flyers, renovated and expanded their training facility, The Virtua Center Flyers Skate Zone, in Voorhees Township in the southern portion of the state.

The Premier Hockey Federation's Metropolitan Riveters currently play at The Rink at the American Dream Meadowlands in the Meadowlands Sports Complex in East Rutherford. While initially beginning in Brooklyn as the New York Riveters, they moved to New Jersey in their 2016 season, where the team has played since, initially playing out of the Barnabas Health Hockey House at the Prudential Center. In 2016 the team formed an affiliation with the New Jersey Devils where the team renamed to the Metropolitan Riveters along with changing their uniform and team colors to match the Devils. The Riveters won both the regular season title and the Isobel Cup in the 2017–18 season. In 2019, this affiliation was terminated between the Devils and the Riveters, which caused the team to revert to their original colors along with finding a new home at the ProSkate Ice Arena in Monmouth Junction.

The New York Metropolitan Area's two National Football League teams, the New York Giants and the New York Jets, both play at MetLife Stadium in East Rutherford's
Meadowlands Sports Complex. At completion, with a construction cost of approximately $1.6 billion, the venue is the most expensive stadium ever built. On February 2, 2014, MetLife Stadium was the host venue for Super Bowl XLVIII. There have been multiple short lived attempts at starting a competing league to the NFL, with teams based in New Jersey. The New Jersey Generals played with the United States Football League at Giants Stadium for three seasons from 1982 until 1985 when the league went bankrupt after an antitrust lawsuit against the NFL. Two attempts by Vince McMahon at creating a competing league, both named the XFL, have been attempted in New Jersey. The first XFL league was created as a joint venture between World Wrestling Entertainment and NBC in 2001, had the New York/New Jersey Hitmen playing at Giants Stadium for the only season they played before the league folded. The New York/New Jersey Hitmen finished in third for the XFL Eastern Division for the season they played. In 2020, the New York Guardians of the newly revived XFL began playing at MetLife Stadium. After the XFL filed for Chapter 11 bankruptcy on April 13, 2020, citing the premature suspension of their season due to the COVID-19 pandemic, the New York Guardians ceased operations. The Guardians brand was later transferred to Orlando.

The New York Red Bulls of Major League Soccer play in Red Bull Arena, a soccer-specific stadium located in Harrison immediately across the Passaic River from downtown Newark. The team was founded in 1994 as the Empire Soccer Club, and renamed to New York/New Jersey Metrostars in 1995 and played under this name until the acquisition of the team by Red Bull GmbH in 2006, where the team was renamed to the New York Red Bulls and dropped their association with New Jersey in the team's name. For the entire team's history, the team has always played in New Jersey, where Giants Stadium served as the team's home stadium, prior to the opening of Red Bull Arena in 2010. On July 27, 2011, Red Bull Arena hosted the 2011 MLS All-Star Game.

NJ/NY Gotham FC was founded in 2008 as Sky Blue FC and began playing in the 2009 Women's Professional Soccer season. After the league was folded in 2012, SkyBlue FC transferred to the National Women's Soccer League beginning in the 2013 season. In November 2019 it was announced that SkyBlue FC will move from Yurcack Field at Rutgers University to Red Bull Arena, for the 2020 NWSL season In April 2021, Sky Blue officially rebranded itself as NJ/NY Gotham FC, Along with the new name, the club introduced a new crest that features the Statue of Liberty’s crown as it was voted the most recognizable symbol of New Jersey and New York. The crest also displays three letters – an “N” and a hybrid “J/Y”, which acknowledges New Jersey as the club’s birthplace while embracing the club’s growing New York reach.

The New York Cosmos of the  North American Soccer League (NASL) played at Giants Stadium from 1977 until the league collapsed at the end of the 1984 season. They won the league championship, the NASL Soccer Bowl, five times.

New Jersey hosted matches during the 1994 FIFA World Cup and is set to host matches during the upcoming 2026 FIFA World Cup.

From 1977 to 2012, New Jersey had a National Basketball Association (NBA) team, the New Jersey Nets, which last played at the Prudential Center in Newark. In 2012, the team was moved to Brooklyn and now plays under the Brooklyn Nets. The Net's former headquarters and training facility in East Rutherford has been renovated into the Meadowlands YMCA . The WNBA's New York Liberty played at the Prudential Center from 2011 to 2013 while Madison Square Garden was renovated. In 2016, the Philadelphia 76ers of the NBA opened their new headquarters and training facility, the Philadelphia 76ers Training Complex, in Camden.

Major league sports

New Jersey teams

New York metropolitan teams that play in New Jersey

Major league professional championships

New Jersey Devils (NHL)
3 Stanley Cup titles
 1995
 2000
 2003

Metropolitan Riveters (PHF)
1 Isobel Cup title
 2018

Newark Eagles (NNL)
1 Negro World Series title
 1946

Semi-pro and minor league sports

New Jersey teams

New York metropolitan minor league teams that play in New Jersey

College sports

Major schools
New Jerseyans' collegiate allegiances are predominantly split among the three major NCAA Division I programs in the state – the Scarlet Knights of Rutgers University (New Jersey's flagship state university), members of the Big Ten Conference; the Pirates of Seton Hall University (the state's largest Catholic university), members of the Big East Conference; and the Tigers of Princeton University (the state's Ivy League university).

Rutgers and Princeton athletics share an intense rivalry – stemming from the first intercollegiate football game in 1869 – though the two schools have not met on the football field since 1980. They continue to play each other annually in all other sports offered by the two universities.

Rutgers, which fields 24 teams in various sports, is nationally known for its excellent football and women's basketball programs, owning a 6-4 all-time bowl record and appearing in a National Final in 2007, respectively. In 2008 and 2009, Rutgers expanded their football home SHI Stadium on the Busch Campus, and the basketball teams play at Jersey Mike's Arena on the Livingston Campus. Both venues and campuses are located in Piscataway, immediately across the Raritan River from New Brunswick. The university also fields rising men's basketball and baseball programs. Rutgers' fan base is mostly derived from the western parts of the state and Middlesex County, not to mention its alumni base, which is the largest in the state.

Rutgers' satellite campuses in Camden and Newark each field their own athletic programs. The Rutgers–Camden athletic teams are called the Scarlet Raptors. The Rutgers–Newark athletic teams are called the Scarlet Raiders. The Scarlet Raiders and the Scarlet Raptors both compete within NCAA Division III.

Seton Hall, unlike Rutgers and Princeton, does not field a football team. Its men's basketball team, however, is one of the Big East's storied programs, New Jersey's most successful representative in the NCAA Division I men's basketball tournament by number of wins, the state's only men's basketball program to reach a modern National Final, and plays its home games at Prudential Center in downtown Newark approximately four miles from the university's South Orange campus. The Pirates, while lacking as large an alumni base as the state university, have a large well of support in the predominantly Roman Catholic areas of the northern part of the state and the Jersey Shore. The annual inter-conference rivalry game between Seton Hall and Rutgers which alternates between Newark and Piscataway, the Garden State Hardwood Classic, has been renewed through 2026.

Other schools
The state's other Division I schools include the Monmouth University Hawks (West Long Branch), the New Jersey Institute of Technology (NJIT) Highlanders (Newark), the Rider University Broncs (Lawrenceville), and the Saint Peter's University Peacocks (Jersey City). Saint Peter's reached national prominence in 2022 when its men's basketball team became the first 15-seed (out of 16 teams in each region) ever to reach the Elite Eight (one step shy of the Final Four) in the NCAA tournament.

Fairleigh Dickinson University competes in both Division I and Division III. It has two campuses, each with its own sports teams. The teams at the Metropolitan Campus are known as the FDU Knights, and compete in the Northeast Conference and NCAA Division I. The College at Florham (FDU-Florham) teams are known as the FDU-Florham Devils and compete in NCAA Division III as a member of the Middle Atlantic Conference and its Freedom Conference.

Among the various Division III schools in the state, the Stevens Ducks, representing Stevens Institute of Technology, have fielded the longest continuously running collegiate men's lacrosse program in the country. 2009 marked the 125th season.

Golf
New Jersey has several notable golf courses, like Atlantic City Country Club, Baltusrol Golf Club, Liberty National Golf Club, Pine Valley Golf Club, Ridgewood Country Club, Scotland Run Golf Club and Trump National Golf Club Bedminster. Notable tournaments include The Northern Trust.

Notable New Jerseyan golfers include Scottie Scheffler, Marina Alex, Megha Ganne, Al Besselink and Vic Ghezzi.

The United States Golf Association (USGA) headquarters and USGA Museum are located in Liberty Corner.

Horse racing
The Meadowlands Sports Complex is also home to the Meadowlands Racetrack, one of two major harness racing tracks in the state along with Freehold Raceway in Freehold. They are also two of the major harness racing tracks in North America. Monmouth Park Racetrack in Oceanport is also a popular spot for thoroughbred racing in New Jersey and the Northeast. It's marquee event is the Haskell Invitational Stakes. It hosted the Breeders' Cup in 2007, and its turf course was renovated in preparation.

Former racetracks include Garden State Park Racetrack and Atlantic City Race Course.

Ultimate
Ultimate, originally known as ultimate Frisbee, originated and was developed in Maplewood in 1968 with the first sanctioned game at Columbia High School between the student council and student newspaper staff.

High school sports
New Jersey high schools are divided into divisions under the New Jersey State Interscholastic Athletic Association.(NJSIAA) ' Founded in 1918, the NJSIAA currently represents 22,000 schools, 330,000 coaches, and almost 4.5 million athletes. Sports are divided between 3 seasons (fall, winter, and spring).

Academies and clubs
New Jersey also features a collection of sports leagues, clubs, and academies for athletic training. Like many suburban communities, most New Jersey towns have individual leagues for America's most popular sports - baseball, softball, football, cheerleading, basketball, soccer, etc.

Stadiums and arenas

Other notable sports venues
 CURE Insurance Arena
 Hinchliffe Stadium
 Hobey Baker Memorial Rink
 Jersey City Armory
 Old Bridge Township Raceway Park
 Richard J. Codey Arena
 Skylands Stadium
 Wall Stadium
 Yogi Berra Stadium

Former notable sports venues
 Bears & Eagles Riverfront Stadium
 Boyle's Thirty Acres
 Giants Stadium
 Meadowlands Arena
 Meadowlands Grand Prix
 Roosevelt Stadium
 Ruppert Stadium
 Trenton Speedway

See also
 List of college athletic programs in New Jersey
 Sports Hall of Fame of New Jersey
 New Jersey Sports Writers Association Hall of Fame

Footnotes

References

External links